Khalil Nathan-Kudzai Madovi (born 10 November 1997) is an English actor, artist and musician. He played Josh Carter in the CBBC series 4 O'Clock Club (2012–2015), for which he won the Children's BAFTA for Best Performer. In 2016, he released an EP titled Mello3.

Early life
Madovi is from Sale, Greater Manchester. He is of Zimbabwean and Jamaican descent. He attended The Manchester Grammar School from 2009 to 2016. He is currently studying at Central Saint Martins for an undergraduate degree in Fine Art.

TV

Film

Awards and nominations 

|-
| 2012
| 4 O'Clock Club
| Best Children's Performer
| BAFTA
| 
| Role: Josh Carter
|

References

English male television actors
Living people
1997 births
21st-century English male actors
BAFTA winners (people)
People from Sale, Greater Manchester
English male rappers
Rappers from Manchester
English people of Jamaican descent
English people of Zimbabwean descent
Black British male actors